The 1928 Yukon general election was held on 16 July 1928 to elect the three members of the Yukon Territorial Council. The council was non-partisan and had merely an advisory role to the federally appointed Commissioner.

Members
Dawson - Andrew Taddie
Mayo - Frank Carscallen
Whitehorse - Willard "Deacon" Phelps

References

1928
1928 elections in Canada
Election
July 1928 events